Faisal Mekdad (born 1954) is the Syrian Foreign Minister and former Permanent Envoy to the United Nations.

Life and education 
Faisal Mekdad was born in the village of Ghasm in Daraa Governorate in 1954. He graduated in 1978 from Damascus University with a degree in English. He later got his PhD in English Literature from Charles University in Prague in 1993. While at Charles University, he was a part of the International Union of Students.

Career
After graduating from Charles University, Mekdad became a diplomat in the Syrian Foreign Ministry. In 1995, he became a member of the Permanent Syrian Delegation to the United Nations where he represented Syria in numerous conferences. He was appointed as the Deputy to the Permanent Representative of Syria to the United Nations, under Mikhail Wehbe.

In 2003, Mekdad became the Permanent Representative of Syria to the United Nations, a position he held until 2006, when he was appointed as Deputy Foreign Minister. In 2006, he was appointed as the Deputy Minister of Foreign Affairs.

On 22 November 2020, Mekdad became the Minister of Foreign Affairs, following the death of Walid Muallem.

Syrian civil war
Mekdad has denied accusations of his government's alleged crackdown on protesters after the start of the Syrian civil war. He has held interviews with Western and Arab Media outlets about the uprising, where he has spoken in support of Bashar al-Assad. He has promoted the government's claim that his government is fighting armed terrorist insurgents, and when asked by a BBC reporter whether he believes his government is winning the war, he responded saying "We shall win it, we are winning it, yes."  Mekdad was a part of the delegation representing the Syrian government during the Geneva II Conference on Syria. The other members with him were Bashar Jaafari, Omran al-Zoubi, Bouthaina Shaaban, Walid Muallem, and Luna Shabal.

In January 2021, the European Union added Mekdad to its sanction list, due to his role during the civil war. The United Kingdom followed two months later, saying he "shares responsibility for the Syrian regime’s violent repression against the civilian population".

Personal life
Faisal Mekdad is married and has one son and two daughters. Mekdad's father was kidnapped by gunmen on 18 May 2013 in his village of Ghasm.

References

1954 births
Living people
People from Daraa District
Syrian Muslims
Permanent Representatives of Syria to the United Nations
Damascus University alumni
Charles University alumni
Foreign ministers of Syria